Steven E. McDonald is an English science fiction writer.  To date he has written four books, many short stories, and a great deal of poetry and non-fiction.  He has worked as a screenwriter both for television and feature films.  He now lives in the US Southwest.

Bibliography

Novels
The Janus Syndrome (1981)
Event Horizon (1997)
Supernova (1999)
Waystation (2004) - Gene Roddenberry's Andromeda series

Short stories
His short story "Silken Dragon" appeared in Dragons of Light edited by Orson Scott Card.

External links
 Janus Syndrome - free ebook at manybooks.net
 
 
 Interview with Katherine Keller (August 6, 2007), Sequential Tart

Living people
1956 births
20th-century American novelists
21st-century American novelists
American fantasy writers
American male novelists
American science fiction writers
American male short story writers
20th-century American short story writers
21st-century American short story writers
20th-century American male writers
21st-century American male writers